Camerano is a comune (municipality) in the Province of Ancona in the Italian region Marche, located about  southeast of Ancona.

Camerano borders the following municipalities: Ancona, Castelfidardo, Osimo, Sirolo.

Camerano is most notable for the extensive tunnel system that lies underneath most of the old city. These tunnels were constructed in the sandstone bedrock of Camera, with constructions happening piecemeal from the Roman era, up until the 1800s. Although the cause for this tunnel building was originally thought to have been as wine storage cellars, later exploration has revealed that these tunnels began with the Romans, and then were greatly enlarged to function as a refuge from the Moorish incursions into Italy during the early medieval period. Later, the tunnels functioned as a city in their own right, complete with churches (identifiable from the bas-relief Greek crosses engraved on the ceilings), wells, and storage areas. Most recently, the caves functioned as a bomb shelter, holding 3,000 people for 8 days in 1944.

References

External links
 Official website
 Virtual Tour of the Cavern System

Cities and towns in the Marche